Republika Srpska official under-23 football team is a youth team of Republika Srpska that represents the Bosnian entity in friendly matches and is controlled by the Football Association of Republika Srpska.

The Republika Srpska U-23 team has played against Serie A team Udinese its first international match on 12 March 2014.

Squad

Current squad
The following players were called up for the match against Asteras Tripoli on 26 March 2015.

Caps and goals as of 27 March 2015.

Recent call-ups
The following players have been called up for the team within the last 12 months.

Current coaching staff

See also
Republika Srpska national under-21 football team
Republika Srpska official football team

References

External links
 Official website

Football in Republika Srpska
Football in Bosnia and Herzegovina